Ray Langton is a fictional character from the British ITV soap opera Coronation Street, played by Neville Buswell.

Storylines
Ray Langton was born at Number 2 Gas Street. Throughout his childhood, he was in trouble with the police most of the time. An ex-borstal boy, Ray built up a reputation as a troublemaker. He first appeared in the Street in 1966 but was sent away by Len Fairclough (Peter Adamson) after he threatened Lucille Hewitt (Jennifer Moss). Nevertheless, Ray returned two years later and Len gave him a job at his building firm and invited him to move into his bachelor pad at No.9. Ray hoped to start his own business but settled for a partnership with Len and Jerry Booth (Graham Haberfield). Ray's younger sister, Janice (Paula Wilcox), visited briefly in 1969.

Ray was a womaniser and was involved with many women while living in the Street, including Sandra Butler (Patricia Fuller), Audrey Fleming (Gillian McCann), Vicki Bright (Clare Sutcliffe) and Sue Silcock (Angela Scoular). In 1975, he married the yard's secretary, Deirdre Hunt (Anne Kirkbride), and they moved into No.5; their daughter, Tracy (Christabel Finch), was born in 1977. His roving eye led him into an affair with waitress Janice Stubbs (Angela Bruce). Deirdre found out so he ended the affair and made plans to move to the Netherlands for a new life and wanted Deirdre and Tracy to come with him. She initially agreed but changed her mind at the last minute so Ray left the street alone. Ray kept in touch and sent Tracy presents, but this dwindled over the years. Eventually, he contacted Deirdre, asking for a divorce as his new partner was pregnant with his child. Ray divorced his second wife sometime around 2000.

When he discovered he had stomach cancer in 2005, he returned to Weatherfield to look for Tracy so he could make amends, arriving on Ken and Deirdre's wedding day and hit baby Amy Barlow (Rebecca Pike)'s pram. He met Deirdre, Blanche Hunt (Maggie Jones) and Ken Barlow (William Roache) at the hospital and realised that Amy is his granddaughter and Tracy was her mother. Ray told them that he had terminal stomach cancer and that he had divorced his Dutch wife a few years before. He stayed with Emily Bishop (Eileen Derbyshire) and Tracy softened towards her birth father Ray. He attended Ken and Deirdre's wedding and wished the couple well. During the reception in the Rovers Return, Ray had died of his illness, much to Tracy's distress.

Development
Ray Langton's departure in 1978 came due to Neville Buswell quitting acting and later leaving to work in Las Vegas. However, he returned in 2005 for a brief stint, 27 years since he portrayed the character.

Neville Buswell is the fourth cast member to have the longest break in Coronation Street, which is a 27-year absence from 1978 to 2005. As of 2011, Philip Lowrie, who played Dennis Tanner, has the record for the longest break between TV appearances in the same show, having been absent for 43 years.

Other appearances
 Ray made a brief cameo appearance in Viva Las Vegas!, a VHS spin-off written by Russell T. Davies and released in 1998, as Buswell was living in Las Vegas at the time. In the storyline Ray is working as a barman and unexpectedly meets Vera Duckworth (Liz Dawn), who is holidaying there. When Vera brings him up to date on some of the things that have happened in Weatherfield since his departure, Ray assumes she must be joking and responds by telling her he's now married to a man and is hiding from his evil twin.

References

External links
Ray Langton at corrie.net

Coronation Street characters
Fictional construction workers
Television characters introduced in 1966
Fictional characters with cancer
Male characters in television